The 2016–17 Dayton Flyers women's basketball team represented the University of Dayton during the 2016–17 NCAA Division I women's basketball season. The Flyers, led by first-year head coach Shauna Green, played their home games at the University of Dayton Arena and are members of the Atlantic 10 Conference. They finished the season 22–10, 13–3 in A-10 play to share the A-10 regular season title with George Washington. They won the A-10 tournament for the first time since 2013 by defeating Duquesne and received an automatic bid to the NCAA women's tournament where they lost to Tennessee in the first round.

On September 7, 2016, it was announced that Jim Jabir will be stepping down as the Flyers' head coach. He finished with a 13-year record of 252–155.

2016–17 media

Dayton Flyers Sports Network
The Dayton Flyers Sports Network will broadcast Flyers games off of their athletic website, DaytonFlyers.com, with Shane White on the call. Most home games will also be featured on the A-10 Digital Network. Select games will be televised.

Roster

Schedule

|-
!colspan=9 style="background:#; color:white;"| Exhibition

|-
!colspan=9 style="background:#; color:white;"| Regular season

|-
!colspan=9 style="background:#; color:white;"| Atlantic 10 Women's Tournament

|-
!colspan=9 style="background:#; color:white;"| NCAA Women's Tournament

Rankings

See also
 2016–17 Dayton Flyers men's basketball team

References

Dayton
Dayton Flyers women's basketball seasons
Dayton
2016 in sports in Ohio
2017 in sports in Ohio